Eliza Potter (1820–1893) was an African-American hairdresser in Cincinnati, Ohio. In 1859 she published her autobiography, A Hairdresser's Experience In High Life.

Potter, a free black woman of mixed race, grew up in New York City. Upon marriage she moved to Philadelphia and gave birth to two children.  According to her memoir, she left her marital home to go "roving".  She traveled widely, including in Europe, and learned her trade. Potter's autobiography provides an intimate glimpse of the experiences of a mixed-race beautician at the hands of her white employers in Cincinnati. She also travelled widely, and recorded the various social customs of New York City, Saratoga, Canada, Paris and London.

References

External links
 

1820 births
1893 deaths
American autobiographers
American hairdressers
African-American women writers
Beauticians
Women autobiographers
American biographers
American women biographers
African-American writers
19th-century American women writers